Movin' in the Right Direction is the debut album by Stephanie Mills released in 1975 on the ABC Records label. It was arranged by Bert Keyes.

Track listing

Personnel
Stephanie Mills - vocals
Bob Rose, Jeff Mironov - guitar
Bob Kreinar - bass
Paul Griffin - keyboards
Bert Keyes - keyboards, arrangements
Herschel Dwellingham - drums
Anthony Hinton, Diane Sumler, Elaine Clark, Hattie Campell, Joey Mills, Julia Stewart, Luther Vandross, Vandetta Jackson - backing vocals

References

External links
 Movin' in the Right Direction at Discogs

1974 debut albums
Stephanie Mills albums
ABC Records albums